Lehman Monroe "Johnny" Tyler (February 6, 1918 – September 25, 1961) was an American country musician.

Biography
His career began around 1945 on Fargo Records with the band Original Hillbillies. In 1947 he signed a recording contract with RCA Victor, where he had the largest success of his career. His most well-known single for RCA was "Oakie Boogie", which hit the Billboard charts in 1947. He also recorded eight tracks with Luke Wills for RCA, and was a member of Wills' band, the "Rhythm Busters" for a time.

In 1953, he appeared on radio WGST out of Atlanta, Georgia. He became a member of Jimmie Smith and His Texans, which often made appearances at the Joe Cotton Rhythm Ranch. He recorded a few more singles at this time as well. In 1954 he played regularly on WGST and on the WSB Barn Dance, with Jimmie Smith. Later singles were issued on Specialty, Ekko, Liberty, Starday, and Rural Rhythm.

He died in 1961 at age 43. In 2004, most of his RCA singles were collected and released on compact disc as Two Dozen Western Swing And Boogie Jewels (Cattle Compact CCD-300). This compilation also includes six tracks with Luke Wills' Rhythm Busters, and the original 1946 Satchel Records version of "Oakie Boogie".

Discography

External links
Johnny Tyler at Hillbilly-Music.com
 

1918 births
1961 deaths
Western swing performers
American country singer-songwriters
Singer-songwriters from Arkansas
Ekko Records artists
Starday Records artists
Specialty Records artists
RCA Victor artists
Liberty Records artists
20th-century American singers
Country musicians from Arkansas